Disperse Orange 1, or 4-anilino-4'-nitroazobenzene, is an azo dye.  Commercial samples contain approximately 25% dye by weight, with the remaining mass consisting of NaCl and other salts.  

This dye is useful in conducting experiments with flash photolysis due to the isomerization effect between the trans-4A4N and cis-4A4N states that occurs during photo relaxation.

References

Azo dyes
Nitrobenzenes
Anilines